Küstriner Bach is a river of Brandenburg, Germany. It flows into the Oberpfuhl, which is drained by the Woblitz, near Lychen. It does not take its name from the town Küstrin (Kostrzyn nad Odrą) but from the village Küstrinchen and the Großer Küstriner See, both near Lychen.

See also
List of rivers of Brandenburg

Rivers of Brandenburg
1KustrinerBach
Rivers of Germany